Robert "Bob" Parr, also known as Mr. Incredible, is a fictional superhero who appears in Disney/Pixar's 6th animated film The Incredibles (2004) and its sequel and 20th animated film Incredibles 2 (2018). He is a superhuman that has superhuman strength, durability, and stamina. He is married to Helen Parr, also known as Elastigirl, and has three children named Dash, Violet, and Jack-Jack. He is voiced by Craig T. Nelson in the films, while in Mr. Incredible and Pals and the video games, he was voiced by Pete Docter, Richard McGonagle and Jeff Bergman. He was created by writer/director, Brad Bird, and is partly based on Bird's father, with Bird stating, "He’s a little bit like my dad, because my dad was a great guy, really funny and smart, and I love him dearly".

Appearances

Films

The Incredibles 

On the day he is set to marry his fiancée Helen (also known as Elastigirl), Bob Parr (also known as Mr. Incredible) rescues Oliver Sansweet from committing suicide by tackling him through a window of a skyscraper currently being robbed by a supervillain called Bomb Voyage. While the two confront each other, a young fan of Mr. Incredible, Buddy Pine, flies in with rocket boots he invented and acts as Mr. Incredible's sidekick "Incrediboy". Bob rejects Buddy as his sidekick, but Bomb Voyage throws a sticky bomb that attaches to Buddy's cape. Bob throws the bomb off of Buddy, but destroys an elevated train track, and Bob prevents the train from falling off. After the wedding, Sansweet and the train passengers sue Bob for their neck injuries. Bob's collateral damage lawsuits, along with similar lawsuits against other superheroes, turn public opinion against them, and the government initiates the Superhero Relocation Program, forcing "supers" to adhere to their secret identities and abandon their exploits.

Fifteen years later, Bob, Helen, and their children Violet, Dash, and Jack-Jack live in the city of Metroville and are forced to keep their superpowers a secret. Although, occasionally Bob, along with his best friend Lucius Best or Frozone, will relive "the glory days" of being a superhero by being a vigilante at night. 

One day while Bob is working as an insurance adjuster, he sees someone getting mugged and goes to stop it, but his supervisor, Gilbert Huph, threatens to fire him if he does. Losing his temper, Bob injures his advisor by throwing him through walls ultimately resulting in him being fired. After being fired Bob goes home and receives a holographic video message from a woman named Mirage asking him to fight an Omnidroid, a tripod-like robot that has gone rogue. Bob takes up on the offer without telling his family and gets on a flight with Mirage where he is taken to an island called Nomanisan to battle the Omnidroid. Bob battles with the droid and tricks it into destroying its own power source deactivating the robot. After the fight, Bob starts to get into shape by doing strenuous workouts. Bob looks at his old super suit and notices a tear in it. He takes it to superhero costume designer Edna Mode. Edna makes entirely new superhero costumes for the entire family assuming Helen knows what he is doing.

Heading back out to Nomanisan, Bob finds out Mirage is working for an adult Buddy, who is now going under the superhero name Syndrome. Syndrome is now an inventor and wealthy arms dealer and has been perfecting the Omnidroid by hiring different superheros to come and fight it. Syndrome intends to send the perfected Omnidroid to Metroville, where he will secretly manipulate its controls to defeat it in public, becoming a "hero" himself. He then plans to sell his inventions to everyone so that everyone can become a superhero, saying that "when everyone's super, no one will be".

Helen gets suspicious of Bob and visits Edna and discovers what Bob has been up too. She activates a beacon Edna built into the suits to find Bob, inadvertently causing him to be captured while infiltrating Syndrome's base. Helen borrows a private plane to travel to Nomanisan, with Violet and Dash as stowaways. Syndrome launches missiles that blow up the plane, much to Bob's dismay, and he threatens to kill Mirage, but is unable to do so despite being encouraged by Syndrome. Helen and the kids survive the missile, and after Helen finds Bob they both hurry to find their children as they are being chased by Syndrome's guards. After finding their kids, they all escape to Metroville in another rocket with Mirage's help. 

Because of the Omnidroids advanced intelligence, it recognizes Syndrome as a threat and shoots off the remote control of the robot off Syndrome's arm. Together Lucius and the Parrs fight to stop the Omnidroid destroying it. When returning home the Parrs figure out Syndrome left to try and kidnap Jack-Jack. As Syndrome flies up toward his jet, Jack-Jack's own shapeshifting superpowers manifest and he escapes Syndrome in midair. Helen catches Jack-Jack, and Bob throws his car at Syndrome's plane as he boards it. Syndrome is sucked into the jet's turbine by his own cape and the plane explodes. Three months later, the Parrs witness the arrival of supervillain the Underminer. They don their superhero masks, ready to face the new threat together as a family.

Incredibles 2 
The Incredibles and Frozone battle The Underminer and successfully  prevent him from destroying City Hall, but are unable to stop him from robbing a bank and escaping. The collateral damage gives the jealous government the perfect excuse to shut down the Superhero Relocation Program, denying the Parrs and other superheroes financial assistance. Violet's love interest Tony Rydinger discovers her superhero identity, causing agent Rick Dicker to erase his memory of her.

Wealthy businessman Winston Deavor and his sister Evelyn, who run the media and telecommunications giant DevTech, propose secret missions for superheroes which will be recorded and publicized to regain public trust. Winston chooses the less accident prone Elastigirl over Mr. Incredible for the initial missions. Bob struggles in his new role as a stay-at-home parent: trying to help Dash with math homework, Violet's heartache over Tony standing her up for their first date (due to his memory wipe), and Jack-Jack wreaking havoc with his burgeoning superpowers. Edna Mode develops a suit to help control Jack-Jack's abilities. Meanwhile, Elastigirl encounters supervillain "the Screenslaver", who projects hypnotic images via TV screens. After preventing him from destroying a crowded commuter train, and thwarting his attempt to assassinate an ambassador, she tracks him to an apartment building and unmasks him as a pizza deliveryman who claims to have no recollection of his actions.

At a party celebrating the Screenslaver's arrest, Winston announces a summit of world leaders to legalize superheroes, hosted aboard his luxury yacht, the Everjust. Elastigirl discovers that the arrested pizza deliveryman is not Screenslaver but was being controlled by hypnotic goggles. Evelyn forces the goggles onto Elastigirl, revealing herself to be the Screenslaver. While keeping her restrained via a chair in a freezing cold room to limit her stretching abilities, Evelyn explains her grudge against superheroes since her father was killed by burglars while trying to call superheroes for help instead of hiding, during the banning and relocation of superheroes 15 years before; (unlike Winston who rightfully believed the lack of superheroes was the reason) and her mother's subsequent death due to heartache. She plans to sabotage her brother's summit by causing a catastrophe to irreparably tarnish the reputation of all superheroes, ensuring they remain outlawed forever and the public will not return to relying on superheroes to handle crises. She lures Bob into a trap and sends a group of hypnotized superheroes to subdue the Parr children. Frozone tries to protect them but is overwhelmed.

Violet, Dash, and Jack-Jack escape in a refurbished Incredibile, the supercar once owned by their father, and reach Winston's yacht. Onboard, the hypnotized Mr. Incredible, Elastigirl, and Frozone recite a vindictive manifesto on air designed to paint superheroes as a threat, and then subdue the ship's crew, aim the yacht at the city, and destroy the controls. Jack-Jack removes Elastigirl's goggles; she in turn frees Mr. Incredible and Frozone. The Incredibles and Frozone release the other mind-controlled superheroes, and all work together to turn the yacht from crashing into the city. Elastigirl apprehends Evelyn attempting to escape in a jet. Superheroes regain legal status around the world.

Some time later, Tony accompanies Violet to a movie with the family. When the Parrs spot a carload of bank robbers, Violet leaves Tony at the theater, promising to be back in time, and the Incredibles suit up and give chase in their Incredibile.

Reception 

Bob has received mixed reception from reviewers, with some believing that he fails to live up to the mantle of a superhero. Stephanie Zacharek from Time positively compared Bob to a real-life father.

In popular culture 
In late 2021, Mr. Incredible became the subject of a popular Internet meme commonly referred to as "Mr. Incredible Becoming Uncanny". The meme features an illustration of Bob Parr, who becomes more traumatized and distorted as a variety of topics and facts are gradually presented in an unsettling manner. The meme originated from a realistic render of the character by animator Nathan Shipley that was created using an artificial intelligence program.

References

External links 
 Official character page

Male characters in animated films
Film characters introduced in 2004
Animated characters introduced in 2004
Animated human characters
Fictional characters with superhuman durability or invulnerability
Fictional characters with superhuman strength
Film and television memes
Film superheroes
Internet memes
Internet memes introduced in 2021
Male characters in film
The Incredibles characters